Rodrigo Daniel Astudillo (born 23 November 1977, in Jesús María) is an Argentine football forward, who currently plays for Millonarios in the Copa Mustang.

Honours 
Talleres
Copa CONMEBOL: 1999
San Lorenzo
Copa Sudamericana: 2002

External links
 
 

1977 births
Living people
Sportspeople from Córdoba Province, Argentina
Argentine footballers
Argentine expatriate footballers
Association football forwards
Talleres de Córdoba footballers
Estudiantes de La Plata footballers
San Lorenzo de Almagro footballers
Nueva Chicago footballers
Universidad de Chile footballers
Cruz Azul footballers
América Futebol Clube (RN) players
Millonarios F.C. players
Club Alianza Lima footballers
América de Cali footballers
Argentine Primera División players
Liga MX players
Categoría Primera A players
Expatriate footballers in Chile
Expatriate footballers in Mexico
Expatriate footballers in Brazil
Expatriate footballers in Colombia
Argentine expatriate sportspeople in Mexico